This is the discography of French rock band Indochine.

Albums

Studio albums

Remastered reissues

Live albums

Compilation albums

Video albums

Singles

Notes

References

Discographies of French artists
Rock music group discographies
New wave discographies